The following is a List of atmospheric pressure records in Europe and the extratropical Northern Atlantic (it does not include localised events, such as those that occur in tornados).

Extreme pressure values in Europe show both seasonal and geographical differentiation. The greatest pressure extremes occur in winter (January) with the deepest lows occurring to the northwest of the continent with a diminishing influence of low pressure to the southeast towards Central Europe and Southeast Europe. This is related to the main cyclonic centre of the Icelandic Low, and the North Atlantic extratropical storm track, close to which have been observed some of the lowest atmospheric pressures of the Northern Hemisphere outside the tropics. Extreme high values are favoured over the north east of Europe where intense cold and long winter nights lead to cooling of the air column by radiative cooling causing sinking air reinforcing the development of the highest pressures. Other influences include the semi-permanent Azores High, and Siberian High.

Land-based observations in Europe 

Land-based records for Europe:
 Highest observed air pressure record:
 22–23 January 1907 in Pärnu, Estonia and Riga, Latvia at 1067.1 mbar reported in peer-reviewed literature.

Other high values have been reported:
 23 January 1907 in Riga at 1068.7 hPa, this value is from a student generated report from the Free University of Berlin Adopt a Vortex scheme. (supported with a 1068 hPa pressure reported in a Danish Meteorological Society publication.)
 17 February 1954 in northern Russia >1060 hPa, This high is claimed to have a pressure over 1070 hPa by a Free University of Berlin student generated report.
 16 February 1956, northern Urals 1070 hPa mentioned in student generated reports from FUB. 1067 hPa in another student report from FUB. Others give a figure for this high of 1065 mslp. An isobar of 1072 over Russia features on the Met Office Daily Weather Report 16 February 1956 centred about the town of Vorkuta, Komi Republic.
 31 January 2012 station Khoseda-Khard directly west of Urals a value of 1068.3 hPa, also reported by SMHI, from a high pressure area named "Cooper/Dieter" by the Free University of Berlin in January 2012 which brought the Early 2012 European cold wave.

Pressure is thought to have risen above 1060 hPa in Europe on only 12 occasions between 1871 and 2010, in the years 1893, 1899, 1907, 1915, 1920, 1938, 1944, 1946, 1956, 1972, 1995 and 2008. To this list might also be included high pressure anticyclones in 1954 and 2012 (see above), and 1869. The most notable high in Europe peaked in January 1907. This was an unusual development that brought high pressure to the west, and holds the officially-recognised record across multiple countries from Scandinavia to Central Europe (Denmark, Norway, Sweden, Finland, Estonia, Latvia, Germany, Czechia, Slovakia, Hungary).

 Lowest air pressure:
 2 December 1929 at Stórhöfði peninsula, Heimaey southwest Iceland 920 hPa.

Another value reported:
 6–7 January 1839, recorded at Sumburgh Head, Shetland during the Night of the big wind storm  this value is from non-standardised equipment, and is not fully supported by values at neighbouring stations (unknown if corrected for MSLP). The conversion to hPa above assumes an Inch of mercury at 0 °F = 3376.85 Pa, if value assumes inHg at 60 °F = 3376.38 Pa the value could be as low as 920.2 hPa.

Northern Europe

Iceland 
 Highest air pressure: 3 January 1841, Reykjavik 1058.0 hPa.
 Lowest air pressure: 2 December 1929 at Stórhöfði peninsula, Heimaey 920 hPa.

Iceland monthly maximum figures for atmospheric pressure

Iceland list of atmospheric pressure over 1050 hPa 
High pressure in Iceland has exceeded 1050 hPa 4 times in the twentieth century and five times in the nineteenth century, and 2 times in the twenty-first century.

Climatic Research Unit Emulate data 1874–2002, also gives values on 10 March 1887 at Stykkishólmur 1052.43 hPa and also 9 January 1977 at the same location 1050.47 hPa.

Iceland monthly minimum figures for atmospheric pressure 

In July the pressure in Iceland has only dropped below 975 hPa or lower three times over the entire record extending back to the 1820s. These cases were 974.1 hPa in Stykkishólmur on 18 July 1901, 974.3 hPa in Stykkishólmur on 19 July 1923 and 975.0 hPa in Reykjavík 11 July 1912.—to which can be added 22 July 2012, with 972.4 hPa reported on the Westman Isles, becoming the new national record for the month.

A recent low pressure on 30 December 2015 was recorded at Kirkjubaejarklaustur (associated with an area of low pressure known as Eckard/Frank) at 930.2 hPa, the lowest pressure recorded on land in Iceland since 1989.

Faroe Islands 

The Danish Meteorological Institute report record atmospheric pressure for the Faroe Islands (since 1961) as:
 Highest air pressure: 13 December 1995, Tórshavn and 28 March 2020 Vágar Airport, 1048.9 hPa.
 
 Lowest air pressure: 11 January 1993, Vágar Airport during the Braer Storm 930.3 hPa.

Climatic Research Unit Emulate data 1874–2002 give 3 dates when pressure exceeded 1050 hPa in Tórshavn.

Ireland 
Met Éireann list the following national records for atmospheric pressure:
 Highest air pressure: 28 January 1905, Valentia Island, Co.Kerry 1051.9 hPa.
 Lowest air pressure: 28 November 1838, Limerick 931.2 hPa.

Ireland monthly maximum figures for atmospheric pressure

Ireland monthly minimum figures for atmospheric pressure

Isle of Man
1957–2005
 Highest air pressure: 26 January 1992, Ronaldsway 1047.8 hPa.
 Lowest air pressure: 1 December 1966, Ronaldsway 946.5 hPa.

An earlier value on 8 December 1886, Cronkbourne .

United Kingdom  

For the United Kingdom, the Met Office record the record figures for atmospheric pressure (which are nominally since 1870) as:
 Highest air pressure: 31 January 1902, Aberdeen Scotland 1053.6 hPa.
 Lowest air pressure: 26 January 1884, Ochtertyre Scotland 925.6 hPa.

On 26 January 1884, during the Ochtertyre storm the Ben Nevis summit weather station recorded a low pressure of 784.7 hPa (at high altitude (above 750 m) and not reduced to sea level) this is proposed as being almost certainly the lowest surface pressure ever recorded in the UK, though due to altitude and not being a value reduced to sea level is not considered comparable to the other records presented here.

A low pressure of 914.0mb affected the UK during the Braer Storm on 10 January 1993, however this figure is discounted as this reading was not recorded in the UK.

United Kingdom monthly maximum figures for atmospheric pressure 

(† note the value of 1054.7 reported in some literature is an incorrect conversion.)

United Kingdom list of atmospheric pressure over 1050 hPa 

In the period of instrumental measurement the atmospheric pressure has exceeded 1048 hPa somewhere over the United Kingdom and Ireland on 18 occasions. On 10 of these times, the pressure exceeded 1050 hPa. Intense high pressure is usually seen during midwinter with eight of the 10 occasions where 1050 hPa has been exceeded occurring in January.

Pressure values have been recorded to have exceeded 1050 hPa in all areas of the UK and Ireland except south east England, though values close to this are documented from January 1882 and January 1905. To which high pressure in January 2020 saw a value of 1049.6 at Heathrow Airport measured, which is thought to be likely the highest pressure seen in the region with records back to 1692.

United Kingdom monthly minimum figures for atmospheric pressure 

Cyclone Oratia is estimated to have reached a low of 941 hPa in peer reviewed literature, though the lowest pressure occurred between Aberdeen and Norway over the North Sea and is not a land-based observation. The lowest land-based reported UK pressure during this storm was recorded from RAF Fylingdales at 951.2 hPa.

On 7 September 1995, Scilly Isles, reported a low pressure of 966 hPa. The lowest minimum recorded values for the months May to August lie within 0.5 of 968 hPa.

The 20th Century low pressure record in the UK occurred on 20 December 1982 at Sule Skerry it may have dropped as low as 936 mbar.

United Kingdom list of atmospheric pressure below 950 hPa (incomplete) 
 1821 December 25, London .
 1839 January 7, Night of the big wind, pressure below  at Inchkeith, Peterhead and Aberdeen.
 1865 November 22,
 1884 January 26, Ochtertyre, record lowest pressure value for the UK.
 1886 December 8,
 1982 December 20, Stornoway 937.6 hPa.
 1989 February 25, Portland, Dorset 948.8.
 2013 December 24, Cyclone Dirk, Stornoway 936.8 hPa.
 2020 February 9 Storm Ciara, Kirkwall Airport 945 hPa.

Home nation records
Based on Burt (2007)  and Met Office.

Scotland
Same as UK national records.
 Highest: 31 January 1902, Aberdeen Observatory 1053.6 hPa.
 Lowest: 26 January 1884, Ochtertyre Scotland 925.6 hPa.

Northern Ireland

 High: 29 March 2020, The Northern Irish north coast likely saw a value in the region of ~1051 hPa around Magilligan Point.
29 March 2020, Belfast Aldergrove 1049.8 hPa.
 Lowest: 8 December 1886, in Belfast 927.2 hPa. (A reading of 922.5 mbar (corrected to MSL) was reported from Omagh in Co. Tyrone (Harding 1887) the graduation and calibration of the barometer were not considered satisfactory enough “to quote the reading as trustworthy”, the storm minimum over the Northern Ireland was thought to be close to 924 mbar.)

Wales
 Highest: 19 January 2020, Mumbles Head, West Glamorgan 1050.5 hPa.
Previously: 28 January 1905, Pembroke, 1050.1 hPa.

 Lowest: 22 November 1865, Dolgellau, North Wales 944.8 hPa.

England
 Highest: 28 January 1905, Falmouth, Cornwall .
 Lowest: 8 December 1886, Stonyhurst in Lancashire, where the barometer fell to 940.4 hPa.
Alt. 8 December 1886, Newton Reigny in Cumbria, .

Norway 
Yr.no the joint venture between the Norwegian Broadcasting Corporation and the Norwegian Meteorological Institute give the national pressure records as:
 Highest air pressure: 23 January 1907, Dalen, Telemark 1 061.3 hPa.
 Lowest air pressure:  20 February 1907, at Skudenes on the island of Karmøy, Rogaland 938.5 hPa.

(formerly listed as 27 January 1907, Bergen 936 hPa.)

A value of 702.0 mm Hg at Bergen Lungegård Hospital on January 27, 1884 (935.8 hPa) is also reported, which is likely to be from the same low as the UK record from Ochtertyre the previous day. Other sources give a pressure value of 939.8 hPa or 939.7 hPa in Bergen on 27 January 1884.

Both records in same winter as each other and those of Denmark.

Norway uses a different formula for correction of air pressure to sea level than Sweden. This affects the result for high altitude stations in cold weather.

Denmark 
The Danish Meteorological Institute report record barometric pressure for Denmark (since 1874) as:
 Highest air pressure: 23 January 1907, Skagen and Copenhagen 1062.2 hPa.
 Lowest air pressure: 20 February 1907, Skagen 943.5 hPa.

Danish records both occurred within a month during the same winter, and same winter as Norwegian records.

Denmark monthly maximum figures for atmospheric pressure

Denmark list of barometric pressure over 1050 hPa

Denmark monthly minimum figures for atmospheric pressure

Sweden 
The Swedish Meteorological and Hydrological Institute give the nation's barometric records as:

 Highest air pressure: 23 January 1907 in Kalmar and Visby 1063.7 hPa.
 Lowest air pressure: 6 December 1895 Härnösand 938.4 hPa.

Sweden monthly maximum figures for atmospheric pressure

Sweden monthly minimum figures for atmospheric pressure

Finland 

According to the Finnish Meteorological Institute:
 Highest air pressure: 22 January 1907, Helsinki 1066 hPa.
 Lowest air pressure: 27 February 1990 Kuuskajaskari, Rauma 940 hPa.

Though a reported low value by Weather Underground weather historian Christopher Burt on 1 March 1990 at an unknown location is reported at 939.7 hPa. Helsingin Sanomat report a value at Turku Airport on 28 February 1990 of 939.8 hPa, with the previous record reported as being from 16 December 1982 on Moikpää, in the Kvarken at 942.1 hPa.

Baltics

Maximum pressure in Europe 22–23 January 1907 recorded in Pärnu, Estonia and Riga, Latvia at 1067.1 mbar. The Free University of Berlin state the European air pressure record is 23 January 1907 in Riga at 1068.7 hPa.

Estonia
As reported by the Estonian Weather Service
 Highest air pressure: 23 January 1907, Tallinn 1060.3 hPa.‡
Alt: 21 November 1993, Narva 1057.2 hPa.
 Lowest air pressure: 16 December 1982, Naissaar 947.6 hPa.
16 December 1982 Väike-Maarja 936.0 hPa is a station level value.

‡The Estonian Weather Service report on their website the record maximum observed air pressure in the country as 1060.3 hPa recorded 23 January 1907 in Tallinn. This figure is not supported by NOAA reanalysis charts and the values reported from neighbouring Finland and Latvia probably make this figure an underestimation or error. A possible maximum pressure value for the whole of Europe is thought to have occurred during the 22–23 January 1907 high pressure event with a record set in Pärnu, Estonia and Riga, Latvia at 1067.1 mbar. Though this value is exceeded by the value on 23 January 1907 in Riga reported at 1068.7 hPa by the Free University of Berlin's student generated reports, at which time the pressure is estimated to have reached around 1070 hPa by Yr.no in the Gulf of Riga.

Latvia
 Highest air pressure: 22–23 January 1907 Liepāja 1065.9 hPa
In the period 1960 to 2014, 16 December 1997 Daugavpils a value of 1055.8 hPa recorded.
 Low air pressure: 13 February 1962 Vidzeme Upland 932.9 hPa (probably a station level reading).

Lithuania
 Highest air pressure: December 1889 Vilnius 1058.5 hPa
 Lowest air pressure: January 1931 Ukmergė and Dotnuva 951.6 hPa.

23 January 1907 1065.1 hPa. According to an article in the German-Austrian expert journal Meteorologische Zeitschrift, on 23 January 1907 at 7 hrs Vilnius (Wilna) reached .

Kaliningrad/Königsberg
 Highest air pressure: 23 January 1907 1064.7 hPa

Western Europe

Channel Islands

Jersey
1862–present
 Highest air pressure: 29 January 1905, Jersey 1051.7 hPa.
 Lowest air pressure: 25 February 1989, Jersey 953.8 hPa.

Guernsey
Guernsey Airport 1960–present.
 Highest air pressure: 20 January 2020, 1049.1 hPa.
Formerly 3 March 1990, 1047.7 hPa.
 Lowest air pressure: 25 February 1989, 952.5 hPa.

Alderney
Highest air pressure 20 January 2020, 1049.8 hPa.

France

Météo-France figures from 1951–present.
 Highest air pressure: 20 January 2020, Abbeville, Somme 1049.7 hPa
Previously: 3 March 1990, Pointe de Chémoulin, Saint-Nazaire Loire-Atlantique 1048.9 hPa.
 Lowest air pressure: 25 February 1989, Cap de La Hague, Cherbourg 951.8 hPa.
though other listed figures predate Météo-France's records.
 Highest air pressure: 6 February 1821 Paris 1050.4 hPa.
 Lowest air pressure: 25 December 1821 Boulogne sur mer 947.1 hPa.

On the 29 January 1905, the atmospheric pressure reached a value of 1049.3 hPa in Paris.

Belgium
The Belgian Royal Meteorological Institute gives the national record values as:
 Highest air pressure: 20 January 2020, Uccle 1048.3 hPa.
Previously: 27 January 1932, Uccle 1048 hPa.
 Lowest air pressure: 25 February 1989, Blankenberge 954 hPa.

Luxembourg

 Highest pressure: 20 January 2020 Luxembourg Findel Airport 1048.0 hPa.

Previously:27–28 December 2016, MeteoLux recorded the highest atmospheric pressures observed at the Luxembourg Findel Airport weather station since measurement began in 1947, a value of 1047.2 hPa was recorded twice (under the high pressure Yörn. The previous record to this was from February 15–16, 1959 at 1046.6 hPa.

 Lowest pressure: February 1989 Luxembourg Findel Airport, 959.8.

Netherlands
The Dutch Royal Netherlands Meteorological Institute lists the following as national records:
 Highest air pressure: 26 January 1932, De Bilt, Utrecht 1050.4 hPa.
 weergegevens.nl give a value on 23 January 1907 at Eelde of 1053.0 hPa.
 Lowest air pressure: 27 November 1983, Eelde, Drenthe 954.2 hPa.

Netherlands monthly maximum figures for atmospheric pressure

Netherlands monthly minimum figures for atmospheric pressure

Germany
The German weather service (DWD) give the

 Highest air pressure: 23 January 1907, Greifswald, Mecklenburg-Vorpommern  1060.8 hPa.
 Lowest air pressure: 27 November 1983 in Emden, Lower Saxony at 954.4 hPa.

Other record figures and locations are also presented:
 23 January 1907 Dahlem (Berlin) 1057.8 hPa. It is claimed this is an incorrect correction to mslp and correct value is 1056.7 hPa. (neither figure is higher than the DWD value)

Germany monthly maximum figures for atmospheric pressure

Central Europe

Poland
 The Polish Institute of Meteorology and Water Management list a record high pressure (post-war) on 16 December 1997 with 1054.4 hPa recorded in Suwalki.

It is likely 23 January 1907 saw a pressure of 1064.8 ± 0.5 mbar over Polish territory. According to an article in the German-Austrian expert journal Meteorologische Zeitschrift, on 23 January 1907 Suwalki reached  and Warsaw (Warschau)  at 7 hrs, while Nowy Port (Neufahrwasser)  at 13 hrs.

Other high pressures are reported as 1051.1 hPa January 22, 2006, 1050 hPa January 3, 1993 and 1048 hPa 10 December 1991.

 The lowest post WWII value of 965.2 hPa is reported from February 26, 1989 in Szczecin and Lodz.

Reanalysis data show a low record likely occurred on 17 January 1931 when a below 960 hPa low moved over the Baltic skirting the very north of today's Polish territory.

Switzerland

 A high pressure from MeteoSwiss: 16 January 1882 at Zürichberg 1047 hPa.

 27 December 2016 during the high pressure Yörn Bischofszell reported a QFF value of 1048.3 hPa. With the weather station at Zürichberg reporting its highest ever value since the station was established in 1949.

Other high pressures in Switzerland are given as 3–4 March 1990 at Zurich Airport of >1047 hPa and 29 January 1989 at Schaffhausen of 1047.2 hPa, which was the highest pressure in the country since the 1950s, when values on 15 February 1959 at Kloten reached 1047.1 hPa. A high value of 1050.2 hPa at Bern on 17 January 1882 is proposed as having occurred (on an internet forum). Though values in MeteoSwiss annals are unreduced to MSLP.

Liechtenstein
A private weather station in Balzers, southwest Liechtenstein reported on 28 December 2016 a value of 1046.4 hPa under the high named Yörn, described as a record by the Liechtensteiner Vaterland.

Austria
 A high pressure on 16 January 1882 Vienna 1050.5 hPa, the highest there since 1775. 
The highest value is likely to have occurred during the 1907 high pressure event.
 A low pressure could possibly be 2 or 3 Dec 1976 (Based on HU and CZ records) <970 hPa.

Czechia
 23 January 1907 Bystřice pod Hostýnem 1057.2 hPa.

A pressure value above >1050 hPa is also proposed on internet forums on 16 January 1882.

 Lowest 26 February 1989 Čáslav 967.2 hPa appeared in press citing a Czech Hydrometeorological Institute employee.

Slovakia
The Slovak Hydrometeorological Institute report:
 Highest air pressure: 23 January 1907 Oravský Podzámok 1062.3 hPa (possible error +0.1 hPa)

Low air pressure (1961-2010): 3 December 1976 Boľkovce 970.2 hPa (the lowest published value; though is not thought to be a correct absolute minimum)

Hungary
The Hungarian Meteorological Service (OMSZ) gives the following values:
 Highest air pressure: 24 January 1907 Budapest 1055.9 hPa.
A Hungarian meteorological journal Időjarás reports  in Budapest on the same day.
 Lowest air pressure: 2 December 1976 Nagykanizsa 968.6 hPa.

Slovenia
The Slovenian Environment Agency (ARSO) tweeted that pressure on 20 January 2020 reached 1048 hPa, slightly below the values seen on 
January 24, 1907 and 24 December 1963.

A high pressure: attributed to ARSO 24 December 1963 in Murska Sobota 1052 hPa.

Italy

A high pressure:  16 January 1882, Turin 1049.3 hPa.

A low pressure: 2 December 1976, Turin 971.7 hPa.

Southeast Europe

Croatia
Highest air pressure: January 1907 Gradec, Zagreb 1049 hPa.
On 21 January 2020 the Croatian Meteorological and Hydrological Service (DHMZ) tweeted a high pressure value at Kutjevo in eastern Croatia at 1050 hPa.

Serbia

Romania
 A high air pressure on 24 January 1907 is reported at >1060 over Romania.
Articles in expert journals Időjarás and Pótfüzetek a Természettudományi Közlönyhöz report  on 24 January 1907 in Sibiu (Nagyszeben).

Greece
A high pressure: 24 January 1907 Athens 8 am daily reading .
A low pressure: 21–22 January 2004 Icaria 972 hPa.

Eastern Europe

Ukraine
According to an article in the German-Austrian expert journal Meteorologische Zeitschrift, Lviv (Lemberg) reached  on 23 January 1907 at 21 hrs.

Belarus

Iberia

Spain
 A provisional highest atmospheric pressure: 9 January 2015 Castile and León ~1050 hPa. Benavente, Zamora reached 1050.6 hPa breaking the previous record from 10 December 1980 at L'Estartit north eastern Spain at 1045 hPa.

 A low air pressure: February 1941, Santander 950 hPa.

Balearic islands
 Highest air pressure: 9 January 2015, Ibiza Airport 1041.1 hPa. The 9 January 2015 air pressure was 0.3 hPa more than the previous record from January 1983.

Portugal
 Highest air pressure: 9 January 2015 Chaves and Bragança, Portugal 1050.3 hPa. The first time values over 1050 hPa had been recorded in continental Portugal.
 A low air pressure: 15 February 1941 in Évora at 931 hPa is reported by one source, which also reports a minimum value of 937 hPa in Coimbra and 950 hPa in Lisbon during the passage of this low pressure. The Instituto Português do Mar e da Atmosfera give a value of 938.5 hPa at station level for Coimbra (not MSLP). Other sources only give minimum values of around 950 hPa in Lisbon as the minimum during the passage of this low. Garnier et al. (2018) state a pressure of 948.29 hPa recorded by the meteorological services on 15 February 1941, which is described as the lowest pressure recorded in the Algarve area since 1854.

Notable non-tropical pressures over the North Atlantic

Notable atmospheric pressure reports from offshore and in the North Atlantic are:

 High pressure, 28 January 2003 saw high of 1057 centred at 51° N, 27° W (approx. 1000km north of Azores).

A lower value is reported from 27 to 28 February 1988 at 1053 hPa centred at approximately  53.5° N, 25.6° W.

 Low pressure, Two or three (possibly four) non-tropical areas of low pressure with central low pressure over the North Atlantic below 920 hPa have been reported, with a further unverified instance during the Night of the Big Wind (see above), these represent globally the lowest non-tropical large-scale synoptic values.

 13 January 1993 Braer Storm dropped 78 hPa in 24 hours, to a central pressure out in the Atlantic at 62° N, 15° W of 914.0 hPa, and was likely the deepest cyclone on record for the North Atlantic, and very probably for any temperate latitude.

 14–15 December 1986, The British Meteorological Office assessed the centre of a depression at about 916 hPa, the West German Meteorological Service enclosed the depression with a 915 hPa isobar, indicating a pressure possibly as low as 912–913 hPa.

For comparison, the lowest Atlantic basin tropical cyclone low pressure is Hurricane Wilma in 2005, which holds the record at 882 hPa.(see list of most intense tropical cyclones in the North Atlantic).

Similarly low extra-tropical values elsewhere have only been documented near Antarctica, with 919 hPa observed at Casey Station on the Windmill Islands (just outside the Antarctic Circle) on August 8–9, 1976 at Vincennes Bay (66°17’S 110°31’E). Though this value is considerably lower than any other on record and could conceivably be a fault with the recording instrument, though values are internally consistent with readings below 940 mb at this time.

The two lowest extra-tropical pressures reported from the Pacific basin are the 8 November 2014 Bering Sea cyclone at 924 hPa (warnings for the low to reach 920 hPa were released by the Japan Meteorological Agency), and the 13 December 2015 North Pacific low at 924 hPa. 31 December 2020 NWS OPC analysis of a low 52N 173E down to 921 hPa.

North Atlantic low pressures below 940 hPa
During a typical winter, one or perhaps two low pressure areas in the North Atlantic will deepen below 950 hPa, with pressures only deepening below 940 hPa on average once or twice per decade. Before the satellite and weather model era, records (mostly from shipping) reported barometric pressures over the extratropical North Atlantic as going as low as 925 hPa, with values below 940 hPa being very rare occurrences. The frequency of very deep depressions (central pressure below about 940 hPa) in the North Atlantic is thought to have increased significantly since the winter of 1982/83 to 1993.

Table of North Atlantic low pressures below 940 hPa (incomplete)

See also 
 Climate of Europe
 Climate of the United Kingdom
 United Kingdom weather records
 List of weather records

Notes

References

External links
Analysis of the evolution of the 1907 high pressure event. Slovakian Hydrometeorological Institute (In Slovakian).

Climate of Europe
Europe-related lists
Lists of weather records